(born February 4, 1966) is a Japanese singer and actress. She is signed to Victor Entertainment.

Career
In 1981, Kyoko Koizumi participated and won the Star Tanjo! programme and released her 1st single in March 1982. She gained her first number one hit in 1984 and thereafter established herself as one of Japan's most popular pop idols, alongside rivals Seiko Matsuda and Akina Nakamori.

Her biggest hit (あなたに会えてよかった) came in 1991, which sold more than a million copies in Japan alone. Koizumi went on to release another single (優しい雨) which is also over a million copies in total sale in 1993.

Koizumi had singles reach the Top Ten for 12 consecutive years between 1983 and 1994, a female solo artist record, until this was broken by Namie Amuro. In the 1990s, she released a few dance remixes on vinyl only under the Koizumix Production moniker. She has worked with Yoko Kanno who composed the music for Koizumi's 1996 album, Otoko no Ko Onna no Ko. She had her first hit single in 18 years when her version of the song "Shiosai no Memorī" from the 2013 NHK morning television drama Amachan, in which Koizumi also acted, reached number 2 on the Oricon Singles Chart. With that, Koizumi made her 6th appearance (as a special guest performer) in the annual Red and White Song Festival, having previously participated from 1984 to 1988.

From mid 90s onward, Koizumi shifted her focus onto acting. As an actress, she played in numerous dramas and movies, most notably, she was cast in two of the most successful movies in Japan ever: as the serial killer in Bayside Shakedown: The Movie (1998) and as the witch in Onmyoji (2001).

She starred in Toshiaki Toyoda's 2006 film Hanging Garden and Kiyoshi Kurosawa's 2008 film Tokyo Sonata. She starred in Kurosawa's 2012 television drama Penance.

Koizumi was given the Best Actress award at the 1989 Yokohama Film Festival for her work in the film Kaito Ruby. She won the award for best actress at the 26th Hochi Film Awards for Kaza Hana. She also won the award for Best Actress at the 66th Mainichi Film Awards for Mainichi Kaasan.

She recently featured in the French-Japanese film, Umami, directed by Slony Sow and starring Gerard Depardieu, production of which took place in Hokkaido, Japan and Saumur, France.

Personal life
She married actor Masatoshi Nagase in 1995, and divorced in 2004.

Discography

Studio albums
 My Fantasy (1982)
 Utairo no Kisetsu (1982)
 Breezing (1983)
 Whisper (1983)
 Betty (1984)
 Today's Girl (1985)
 Flapper (1985)
 Kyoko no Kiyoku Tanoshiku Utsukushiku (1986)
 Liar (1986)
 Hippies (1987)
 Phantasien (1987)
 BEAT POP ~Koizumi Kyoko Super Session (1988)
 Natsumelo (1988)
 Koizumi in the House (1989)
 No. 17 (1990)
 Afropia (1991)
 Travel Rock (1993)
 Otoko no Ko Onna no Ko (1996)
 Kyo (1998)
 Atsugi I.C. (2003)
 Nice Middle (2008)
 Collaborakyon (2011)
 Koizumi Chansonnier (2012)

Remix albums
 Master Mix Party (1993) as Koizumix Production
 89–99 Collection: Koizumix Production (1999)

EPs
 Separation Kyoko (1983)
 Kyon Kyon Club (1984)
 Fade Out: Super Remix Tracks (1989)
 Super Remix Tracks II (1990)
 Bambinater (1992) as Koizumix Production
 Inner Beauty (2000)
 Kyō 2 (2001)

Soundtrack albums
 Boku no Onna ni Te wo Dasuna (1987)
 Kaitou Ruby (1988)

Compilations
 Super Best: Thank You Kyoko (1983)
 Celebration (1984)
 Melodies: Kyoko Koizumi Song Book (1985)
 Do You Love Me (1985)
 The Best (1986)
 Ballad Classics (1987)
 CD File vol. 1 (Singles A & B) (1987)
 CD File vol. 2 (Singles A & B) (1987)
 CD File vol. 3 (Singles A & B) (1987)
 Best of Kyong King (1988)
 Ballad Classics II (1989)
 CD File vol. 4 (Singles A & B) (1989)
 K2 Best Seller (1992)
 Anytime (1994)
 Kyon 3, Koizumi the Great 51 (2002)
 K25 Kyoko Koizumi All Time Best (2007)

Filmography

Film
 The Adventures of Milo and Otis (1986)
 Kaitō Ruby (1988)
 Bayside Shakedown: The Movie (1998)
 Kyohansha (1999)
 Kaza Hana (2000)
 Onmyoji (2001)
 Blue Spring (2001)
 Rockers (2003)
 What the Snow Brings (2005)
 Hanging Garden (2005)
 Survive Style 5+ (2005)
 Tears for You (2006)
 Love My Life (2006)
 Yajikita Dochu Teresuko (2007)
 Sakuran (2007)
 Tokyo Tower: Mom and Me, and Sometimes Dad (2007)
 Adrift in Tokyo (2007)
 Gu-Gu Datte Neko de Aru (2008)
 Tokyo Sonata (2008)
 Mother Water (2010)
 Mainichi Kaasan (2011)
 Kako: My Sullen Past (2016)
 Before We Vanish (2017)
 Eating Women (2018), Atsuko
 Umami (2021), Taya

Television
 Toge no Gunzo (1982)
 Ato wa Neru Dake (1983)
 Anmitsu Hime (1983)
 Shojo ni Nani ga Okotta ka (1985)
 Hanayome Ningo wa Nemuranai (1986)
 Aishiatteru Kai (1989)
 Ashita wa Atashi no Kaze ga Fuku (1989)
 Papa to Natchan (1991)
 Anata Dake Mienai (1992)
 Chance (1993)
 Aisuru to Iu Koto (1993)
 Boku ga Kanojo ni Shakkin wo Shita Riyu (1994)
 Mada Koi wa Hajimaranai (1995)
 Melody (1997)
 Kamisan Nanka Kowakunai (1998)
 Owari no Nai Dowa (1998)
 Renai Kekkon no Rule (1999)
 Koi wo Nannen Yasundemasu ka (2001)
 Shiritsu Tantei Hama Mike (2002)
 Kawa, Itsuka Umi e (2003)
 Manhattan Love Story (2003)
 Sensei no Kaban (2003)
 Suika (2003)
 Yasashii Jikan (2005)
 Sailor Suit and Machine Gun (2006)
 Hatachi no Koibito (2007)
 Saigo Kara Nibanme no Koi (2012)
 Penance (2012)
 Amachan (2013), Haruko Amano
 Zoku – Saigo Kara Nibanme no Koi (2014)
 Totto TV (2016), narrator
 Kangoku no Ohimesama (2017), Kayo Baba
 Idaten (2019), Mitsuko
 First Love (2022)

References

External links
 
 
 

1966 births
Living people
Japanese idols
Japanese women pop singers
Japanese film actresses
Japanese television actresses
People from Atsugi, Kanagawa
Actresses from Kanagawa Prefecture
Musicians from Kanagawa Prefecture
Singing talent show winners
20th-century Japanese actresses
21st-century Japanese actresses
20th-century Japanese women singers
20th-century Japanese singers
21st-century Japanese women singers
21st-century Japanese singers